The 2015 Nigerian House of Representatives elections in Kwara State was held on March 28, 2015, to elect members of the House of Representatives to represent Kwara State, Nigeria.

Overview

Summary

Results

Asa/Ilorin West 
APC candidate Razak Olatunde Atunwa won the election, defeating other party candidates.

Baruten/Kaiama 
APC candidate Zakari Mohammed won the election, defeating other party candidates.

Edu/Moro/Patigi 
APC candidate Aliyu Ahman-Pategi won the election, defeating other party candidates.

Ekiti/Isin/Irepodun/Oke-ero 
APC candidate Olufunke Adedoyin won the election, defeating other party candidates.

Ilorin East/South 
APC candidate Abubakar Amuda-Kannike Garba won the election, defeating other party candidates.

Offa/Oyun/Ifelodun 
APC candidate Olayonu Olarinoye Tope won the election, defeating other party candidates.

References 

Kwara State House of Representatives elections
Federal Capital Territory